Azia is a town in the Ihiala district of Nigeria.  It is named after Azia Alamatugiugele who founded the settlement around 500 AD.

References

Citations

Sources

Populated places in Anambra State